Parker Sawyers (born May 24, 1983) is an American actor.

Career

His first leading film role was starring as a young Barack Obama in Southside With You. He is also featured in Don't Hang Up as Mr. Lee. He also stars as the Parisian jazz musician, Albert Fallou, in the BBC production World on Fire.

He is the son of Paula Parker-Sawyers (now Means), who was deputy mayor of Indianapolis from 1989 to 1991, and James Sawyers, a teacher and administrator.

Filmography

Film

Television

Video Games

References

External links

Living people
1983 births
21st-century American male actors
African-American male actors
People from Indianapolis
American emigrants to England
Wabash College alumni
American male film actors
21st-century African-American people
20th-century African-American people